Pietro Bellora (6 December 1891 – 21 November 1959) was a member of the Italian Christian Democracy, and was an Italian Senator from Lombardy. He died in office in 1959.

Political career
President of the Association of Cotton Industries and member of the board of directors of the Industrial Confederation, Bellora obtained three consecutive elections to the Italian Senate, serving from 1948 to 1959.

Role in the Senate

Committee assignments
Committee on Trade and Industry
Legislature I - II III

Electoral history
1948 election for the Italian Senate
Direct mandate for Clusone (81.0%) obtaining the landslide victory required by law (more than 2/3 of votes)

1953 election for the Italian Senate
Direct mandate for Clusone (70.7%) obtaining the landslide victory required by law (more than 2/3 of votes)

1958 election for the Italian Senate
Christian Democrat mandate thanks to his 67.4% of votes in Clusone

See also
Italian Senate election in Lombardy, 1948
Italian Senate election in Lombardy, 1953

References

External links

Site

1891 births
1959 deaths
People from Gallarate
Christian Democracy (Italy) politicians
Senators of Legislature I of Italy
Senators of Legislature II of Italy
Senators of Legislature III of Italy
Members of the Italian Senate from Lombardy